Ri Jong-hui (born 20 August 1975) is a North Korean women's international footballer who plays as a goalkeeper. She is a member of the North Korea women's national football team. She was part of the team at the 1999 FIFA Women's World Cup and 2003 FIFA Women's World Cup.

References

External links

1975 births
Living people
North Korean women's footballers
North Korea women's international footballers
Place of birth missing (living people)
2003 FIFA Women's World Cup players
Women's association football goalkeepers
Footballers at the 1998 Asian Games
Footballers at the 2002 Asian Games
1999 FIFA Women's World Cup players
Asian Games gold medalists for North Korea
Asian Games silver medalists for North Korea
Asian Games medalists in football
Medalists at the 1998 Asian Games
Medalists at the 2002 Asian Games
20th-century North Korean women
21st-century North Korean women